The 1933 Humboldt State Lumberjacks football team represented Humboldt State College during the 1933 college football season. They competed as an independent.

The 1933 Lumberjacks were led by seventh-year head coach Fred Telonicher. They played home games at Albee Stadium in Eureka, California. Humboldt State finished with a record of one win and one loss (1–1). The Lumberjacks were outscored by their opponents 6–7 for the two-game season.

Schedule

Notes

References

Humboldt State
Humboldt State Lumberjacks football seasons
Humboldt State Lumberjacks football